Ra's Ghareb is the northernmost of the markazes (municipalities) in the Red Sea Governorate, Egypt, situated on the African side of the Gulf of Suez. It has an area of 10,464.46 km². At the 2006 Egyptian national census, the population numbered 32,369.
It is and one of the leading centers of petroleum production in Egypt, having housed the main operations for first the Anglo-Egyptian Oil Company (a branch of Royal Dutch Shell) and then the Egyptian national petroleum company. For a time it was the capital of the Red Sea Governorate.

See also

 List of cities and towns in Egypt

References 

Populated places in Red Sea Governorate
Governorate capitals in Egypt
Cities in Egypt
Metropolitan areas of Egypt
Medieval cities of Egypt